Toulon is an unincorporated community in Big Creek Township, Ellis County, Kansas, United States.  It is located east of Hays along old Hiway 40.

History
Toulon was likely named, directly or indirectly, for the city of Toulon, in France.

A post office in Toulon opened in 1889, closed temporarily in 1891, reopened in 1898, and closed permanently in 1901.

Geography

Transportation
The old alignment of U.S. Route 40, now a paved county road, runs southeast–northwest through Toulon. Another paved county road, Toulon Avenue, runs north–south through the community, connecting to an interchange with Interstate 70 to the north.

The Kansas Pacific (KP) line of the Union Pacific Railroad runs southeast–northwest through Toulon, parallel to the old alignment of U.S. 40.

References

Further reading

External links
 Ellis County maps: Current, Historic, KDOT

Unincorporated communities in Ellis County, Kansas
Unincorporated communities in Kansas